The Dr. Peter Fayssoux House is a pre-Revolutionary house built about 1732 for Alexander Smith. After the Revolutionary War, the Georgian house was home to Dr. Peter Fayssoux, the surgeon general of the Continental Army. In the 1930s, the house was home of Beatrice Ravenel, a Charleston writer.  Dr. Peter Fayssoux was a member of the Society of the Cincinnati of the State of Georgia.

References

Houses in Charleston, South Carolina